FILMAR Racing is a former NASCAR Winston Cup and Busch Series team. It was owned by Fil Martocci and crew chief Gil Martin. The team was sold in 1999 to the Pinnacle Motorsports Group and then to Davis & Weight Motorsports.

Beginnings 
FILMAR began racing in 1989 when they fielded the No. 8 Oldsmobile driven by Bobby Hamilton in the Busch series, winning in September at Richmond. Originally unsponsored, they picked up sponsorship from TIC Financial Industries in June 1990, starting at Orange County Speedway. Hamilton had seven top-fives and finished eleventh in points, but departed for the Winston Cup series and was replaced by David Green. Despite missing a pair of races early in the season, Green won the pole for the season-opening Goody's 300 and won at Lanier Raceway. He finished thirteenth in points and finished runner-up to Jeff Gordon for Rookie of the Year honors. At the end of the season, Green was replaced by Jeff Burton. Burton had four top-fives, including a win at New Hampshire International Speedway, and finished ninth in points.

In 1993, Baby Ruth became the team's sponsor as they switched to Ford, and despite winning at Myrtle Beach Speedway, Burton and the team dropped to fourteenth in points. The team also made its Cup debut that year with Burton at New Hampshire, starting 6th but finishing 37th after their No. 0 Ford wrecked in a lap 3 incident.

Kenny Wallace years 

After Burton left to run for Stavola Brothers Racing's Cup program, Kenny Wallace was hired as the team's new driver for 1994. Wallace won a pole at Nazareth Speedway and won at Bristol, Martinsville, and Richmond late in the year and finished fourth in points. They also ran a Cup race at Michigan, finishing nineteenth in the No. 81 car.

In 1995, FILMAR and Wallace split time between the Cup and Busch Series. In Cup, the team ran 11 races, finishing in the top-30 three times. In Busch, the team ran fifteen races with sponsorship from Red Dog and won at Richmond and finished 27th in points. In addition to winning again at Richmond in 1996, the team moved up to the Cup series full-time with sponsorship from Square D. Wallace had a seventh-place finish at North Carolina Speedway and finished 28th in points. The following season, FILMAR ran its last Busch race at Richmond as the No. 12 Graybar Ford, starting 27th and finishing 26th. That year, Wallace won his first two career poles in Cup at Martinsville and Bristol. Despite two top-tens, Wallace and the team dropped to 33rd in the standings.

In 1998, Wallace posted seven top-tens but failed to qualify twice, finishing 31st in points.

Davis & Weight 
Towards the end of 1998, Wallace announced he and Square D would be departing FILMAR and join Andy Petree Racing. After rumors spread that Todd Bodine or Willy T. Ribbs would be the team's new driver for 1999, Marcotti sold the team to an organization called the Pinnacle Motorsports Group. The team planned to run that year's Daytona 500 with Morgan Shepherd driving, but failed to qualify. The group was sold again to Davis & Weight Motorsports late in the season. The team made its Busch debut at the Food City 250 with Brandon Sperling driving the No. 55 Pontiac Grand Prix with sponsorship from the University of Florida. He started and finished 27th. Michael Ritch ran a pair of races for D&W that year, at Rockingham and Memphis Motorsports Park, his best finish a 35th.

D&W hired Ritch to compete full-time in the Busch Series in 2000 competing for Rookie of the Year honors. In addition, they announced they would run the No. 81 in Cup in five races that season to move up full-time in 2001. Ritch made 21 starts that season and had five top-twenty finishes in the UoF/Kleenex Ford Taurus, and finished 33rd in points, but the team did not attempt any Cup races. In 2001, Mark Green took over, and had a best finish of sixteenth at Darlington Raceway when the team announced it was closing its Busch program to focus on Cup. After announcing they would attempt the Brickyard 400, the team laid off all of its employees and did not attempt a race again.

Winston Cup Results

Car No. 81 results

References

External links 
Fil Martocci Winston Cup Owner Statistics
Fil Martocci - NASCAR owner
Jayski No. 81 page
Davis & Weight Motorsports Home Page

American auto racing teams
Companies based in North Carolina
Defunct companies based in North Carolina
Defunct NASCAR teams
Auto racing teams established in 1989
Auto racing teams disestablished in 2003